The SEP law (Spanish: Ley SEP, Subvención Escolar Preferencial) is a Chilean law which lets the State to devote additional monetary resources to primary and secondary schools for them to improve the educational conditions.

External links
 Subvención Escolar Preferencial 

Education in Chile